Batman: The Brave and the Bold is an American animated television series based in part on the DC Comics series The Brave and the Bold which features two or more superheroes coming together to solve a crime or foil a super villain. As the title suggests, the series focuses on Batman's regular "team-ups" with various heroes similar to the most well-known version of the original comic book series. This version has a much lighter and simpler, often comic feel, targeting younger viewers more than the character's other series. The series premiered on November 14, 2008, on Cartoon Network in the United States, and ended on November 18, 2011. It also aired in Canada on Teletoon.

It was the first series produced by Warner Bros. Animation to be broadcast in high definition.

Overview
Each episode of Batman: The Brave and the Bold features the main character (Batman) teaming up with other characters from the DC Universe to thwart villains or to solve crimes, the show focusing mainly on the inclusion of lesser-known characters. Most episodes have a cold open with an escapade not related to the remainder of the episode. In the first season, the villain was Equinox, who later returned in "Time Out for Vengeance!"; and in the second season, the villain was the alien Starro. During production, the show's creator said that if a character's cold open appearance was deemed successful, then it may warrant exploring the character further in a future episode's main adventure.

Batman: The Brave and the Bold ended after season three, which consisted of 13 episodes. After it ended, a new show, Beware the Batman, returned the character to a more serious tone. However, a new direct-to-video crossover with Scooby-Doo, entitled Scooby-Doo! & Batman: The Brave and the Bold, was released in 2018.

Characters

Cast

Principal cast
 Diedrich Bader – Batman / Bruce Wayne / Matches Malone, Kilowog, Ace, Owlman, Solomon Grundy, Punch, Gorilla Boss, Batman (Damian Wayne), Lord Death Man, Creepy Usher, Caveman Batman, Pirate Batman, Batmanicus, Robot Batman, Musketeer 
 Jeff Bennett – Joker / Red Hood, Captain Marvel, Abra Kadabra, OMAC, Batman's Singing Voice, Rubberneck, Joker-Mite, Joker Jr., Rubin, Penguin (Scooby-Doo version), Prez Richards, El Gaucho, Ultra-Humanite, Starman
 Corey Burton – Red Tornado, Doctor Mid-Nite, Thomas Wayne, Milton Magnus, Mercury, Silver Cyclone, False-Face, Chancellor Gor-Zonn, General Zahl, Killer Moth, Batman (Bat-Manga version), Joker (Scooby-Doo version), Green Lantern (Alan Scott)
 John DiMaggio – Aquaman, Gorilla Grodd, Faceless Hunter, Black Mask, Tiger Soldier, Typhon, Enemy Ace, Ubu, Black Adam, Tattoo, Pharaoh, Toyman, Vigilante, Hellgrammite, Mr. Freeze, Legionnaire, Captain Boomerang, Owen
 Will Friedle – Blue Beetle / Jaime Reyes, Scarlet Scarab, Lazy Eye
 Tom Kenny – Plastic Man, Baby Face, Ray, Deadshot, Mirror Master, 'Mazing Man
 James Arnold Taylor – Green Arrow, Green Lantern (Guy Gardner), Blue Bowman, Major Disaster, Wotan, Nabu, Mark Desmond, Arges, Leslie "Rocky" Davis, Alpha-Red, G.I. Robot, Jace

Special guest cast

 Morena Baccarin – Cheetah
 Edoardo Ballerini – Vulture, Jack
 Xander Berkeley – Sinestro
 Clancy Brown – Per Degaton, Rohtul
 Gabrielle Carteris – Vicki Vale, Princess Laethwen
 Patrick Cavanaugh – Robin (Damian Wayne)
 Mindy Cohn – Velma Dinkley
 Jeffrey Combs – Kite Man
 Kevin Conroy – Batman of Zur-En-Arrh, Phantom Stranger
 Tim Conway – Weeper
 Olivia d'Abo – Elasti-Girl
 Diane Delano – Big Barda
 Dana Delany – Vilsi Vaylar
 Michael Dorn – Bane, Kru'll the Eternal
 Greg Ellis – Gentleman Ghost, Doctor Fate, Cavalier, Dr. Canus, Hawk, Shrapnel, Signalman, Mr. Mind, Big Headed Batman
 R. Lee Ermey – Wildcat 
 Oded Fehr – Equinox
 Ellen Greene – Mrs. Manface
 Ioan Gruffudd – Matthew "Red" Ryan, Blue Beetle Scarab / Reach
 Mark Hamill – Spectre
 Neil Patrick Harris – Music Meister
 Tippi Hedren – Hippolyta
 John Michael Higgins – Riddler
 William Katt – Hawkman
 Wallace Langham – Ocean Master
 Loren Lester – Green Lantern (Hal Jordan)
 Vicki Lewis – Wonder Woman
 Matthew Lillard – Shaggy Rogers
 Carl Lumbly – Tornado Champion / Tornado Tyrant
 Tim Matheson – Jarvis Kord
 David McCallum – Merlin
 Ted McGinley – "Aquaman 2"
 Andy Milder – Flash (Jay Garrick)
 Richard Moll – Lew Moxon, Two-Face (in "Chill of the Night!")
 Phil Morris – Jonah Hex, Fox 
 Laraine Newman – Ms. Minerva
 Julie Newmar – Martha Wayne (in "Chill of the Night!")
 Gary Owens – Space Ghost
 Hunter Parrish – Kid Flash, Geo-Force
 Ron Perlman – Doctor Double X
 Jim Piddock – Calendar Man / Calendar King, Doctor Watson, Doctor Sivana, Shazam, Thaddeus Jr.
 James Remar – Two-Face
 Paul Reubens – Bat-Mite
 Henry Rollins – Robotman
 Michael Rosenbaum – Deadman
 Jeffrey Ross – Himself
 Stephen Root – Penguin, Woozy Winks, Planet Master, Killer Croc
 Peter Scolari – Atom (Ray Palmer)
 Tom Everett Scott – Booster Gold
 Jennifer Seman - Star Sapphire
 Armin Shimerman – Calculator, Psycho-Pirate, Walter Mark "Prof" Haley, Guardian of the Universe #2
 John Wesley Shipp – Professor Zoom
 J. K. Simmons – Kyle "Ace" Morgan, Guardian of the Universe #1, Evil Star 
 Cree Summer – Vixen
 Jeffrey Tambor – Crazy Quilt
 Tony Todd – Astaroth
 Alan Tudyk – Flash (Barry Allen)
 Michael T. Weiss – Adam Strange
 Adam West – Thomas Wayne (in "Chill of the Night!"), Proto-Bot
 Wil Wheaton – Blue Beetle (Ted Kord)
 Michael Jai White – Tattooed Man
 Gary Anthony Williams – Mongul, Fun Haus, Mongal
 Tyler James Williams – Jason Rusch / Firestorm
 Wade Williams – Mantis, Supreme Chairman of Qward
 Thomas F. Wilson – Sportsmaster, Catman
 Henry Winkler – Ambush Bug
 Peter Woodward – Ra's al Ghul, Great Caesar 
 Michael-Leon Wooley – Kalibak, Darkseid
 "Weird Al" Yankovic – Himself, Mr. Star

Additional voices

 Sebastian Bader – Robin (Future)
 Dee Bradley Baker – Clock King, Felix Faust, Etrigan the Demon / Jason Blood, Brain, Chemo, Misfit, Scarecrow, Ace the Bat-Hound, Oberon, Ramjam, Dove, Brother Eye, GPA Operative, Fisherman, Professor Zee, Tin, Professor Milo, Animal-Vegetable-Mineral Man, Starro (in "The Siege of Starro" Pt. 2), Haunted Tank, Madniks, Bug-Eyed Bandit, Mister Atom, Baby Batman, Warren Griffith, Vincent Velcro, Pvt. Elliot "Lucky" Taylor, John Wilkes Booth, Punchichi 
 Gregg Berger – Hammer Toes, Brain Scientist, Police Captain, Crime Boss, Creature King
 Brian Bloom – Iron, Oxygen, Creeper, Rip Hunter, Captain Atom
 Steve Blum – Heat Wave, Captain Cold
 Andrea Bowen – Talia al Ghul
 Ian Buchanan – Sherlock Holmes
 Cathy Cavadini – Alanna Strange, Jan, Ruby Ryder, Fiona, Dr. Myrra Rhodes
 Grey DeLisle – Fire, Black Canary (Dinah Laurel Lance), Black Canary (Dinah Drake), Daphne Blake, Robin (Dick Grayson) (Bat-Manga version), Dala
 John DeVito – Captain Marvel Jr.
 Sean Donnellan – Elongated Man, Steve Trevor
 Robin Atkin Downes – Weather Wizard, Kobra, Firefly, Ten-Eyed Man
 Bill Fagerbakke – Ronnie Raymond / Firestorm, Lead, Helium 
 Nika Futterman – Lashina, Catwoman / Selina Kyle
 James Garrett – Alfred Pennyworth
 Zachary Gordon – Young Bruce Wayne, Young Aqualad
 Richard Green – General Kreegaar
 Kim Mai Guest – Katana (in "Inside the Outsiders!")
 Nicholas Guest – Question, Martian Manhunter
 Jennifer Hale – Ramona, Poison Ivy (in "Chill of the Night!"), Zatanna, Killer Frost, Ice
 David K. Hill – Negative Man
 Sirena Irwin – Mera, Lois Lane
 Lauri Johnson – Ma Murder
 Mikey Kelley – Kamandi, Kid Batman 
 Lex Lang – Doctor Polaris, Hourman, Gold / Alloy, Hydrogen, Young Wildcat, Batman (Dick Grayson)
 Hope Levy – Stargirl, Phantom Lady
 Yuri Lowenthal – Mister Miracle, Prince Tuftan, Bulletman
 Tress MacNeille – Ms. Gatsby
 Jason Marsden – Paco, Speedy, Robin (Dick Grayson) (Scooby-Doo version)
 Vanessa Marshall – Poison Ivy (in "The Mask of Matches Malone!"), Batwoman / Katrina Moldoff
 Richard McGonagle – Sardath, Professor Carter Nichols, Chief, Perry White, Brainiac
 Scott Menville – Metamorpho
 Jason C. Miller – Doll Man, Black Condor
 Pat Musick – Martha Wayne (in "Dawn of the Deadman!")
 Ryan Ochoa – Young Speedy 
 Peter Onorati – Joe Chill
 Vyvan Pham – Katana (in "Enter the Outsiders!")
 Alexander Polinsky – Slug, G'nort, Jimmy Olsen
 Rachel Quaintance – Carol Ferris
 Enn Reitel – Chancellor Deraegis
 Peter Renaday – Uncle Sam, Abraham Lincoln
 Kevin Michael Richardson – Black Manta, B'wana Beast, General Steppenwolf, Detective Chimp, Lex Luthor, Despero, Blockbuster, Monsieur Mallah, Starro (in "The Siege of Starro" Pt. 1), Telle-Teg, Barack Obama, Mister Mxyzptlk 
 Bumper Robinson – Black Lightning
 Roger Rose – Superman / Clark Kent, WHIZ Reporter Tom Tyler, Amazo
 Eliza Schneider – Baroness Paula Von Gunther, Georgette Taylor
 Jeremy Shada – Young Robin (Dick Grayson) 
 Zack Shada – Aqualad
 James Sie – Atom (Ryan Choi), Dyna-Mite
 Jane Singer – Jewelee
 Meghan Strange – Harley Quinn
 Preston Strother – Arthur Curry Jr., Chris
 Tara Strong – Huntress, Billy Batson, Mary Marvel, Georgia Sivana, Young Batman
 Gary Anthony Sturgis – Bronze Tiger
 Fred Tatasciore – Mutant Master, Arsenal, Sgt. Rock, Major Force
 Hynden Walch – Platinum, Carbon Dioxide
 Frank Welker – Batboy, Fred Jones, Scooby-Doo, Batman (Scooby-Doo version)
 Billy West – Skeets
 Mae Whitman – Batgirl
 Tyrel Jackson Williams – Kyle 
 Crawford Wilson – Nightwing / Robin
 Marc Worden – Kanjar Ro, Lt. Matthew Shrieve
 Tatyana Yassukovich – Morgaine le Fay
 Keone Young – GPA Operative

Episodes

Production

Writing
The show has no overarching story, instead having most episodes stand alone. The show is lighter in tone than previous Batman series, depicting the Dark Knight as more lighthearted and playful with a "dry, ironic wit." The show features various references to various depictions of Batman in media, including the 1960s Batman TV series.

While the tone is lighter, the series has touched on the subject of death with such examples as retelling the murder of Thomas Wayne and Martha Wayne at the hands of Joe Chill, the death of the Silver Age Blue Beetle, the assassination of Boston Brand, the death of the first Black Canary, the execution of "Gentleman" Jim Craddock, and the self-sacrifice and deaths of B'wana Beast and the Doom Patrol. The tone of the series was addressed in the episode "Legends of the Dark Mite!", when Bat-Mite broke the fourth wall to read out this missive from one of the show's creators:

Show creators have chosen to go with "lesser known" characters. In many instances, the characters are those that were repeatedly teamed with Batman in the 1970s run of the Brave and the Bold comic book, such as Green Arrow, Wildcat, Plastic Man, and even the Joker. Thus, the characters have an appearance and feel very akin to both of their Golden & Silver Age incarnations. While the show has featured major heroes such as the Green Lantern and the Flash, it consistently focused on the lesser-known individuals that portrayed the heroes, such as Guy Gardner and Jay Garrick, rather than the more popular, better known Hal Jordan or Barry Allen, until Barry appeared in the second-season episode "Requiem for a Scarlet Speedster!" (though this episode centers around Kid Flash and Jay Garrick) while Hal appeared in the first-season episode "The Eyes of Despero!" as well as the third-season episode "The Scorn of Star Sapphire". In the episode "Bat-Mite Presents: Batman's Strangest Cases!", Batman even teamed up with Scooby-Doo and the Mystery, Inc. gang to defeat the Joker and the Penguin in a retelling of the two similar crossovers from The New Scooby-Doo Movies.

Additionally, Batman's alter ego of billionaire playboy Bruce Wayne did not appear as an adult during the series in situations where Batman was unmasked. His face was kept hidden until the season 2 episode "Chill of the Night!" when Batman finally confronts Joe Chill. From this episode onwards, whenever Bruce Wayne appears, his face is no longer silhouetted (as in "The Knights of Tomorrow").

Crew
 Michael Jelenic – Producer, Story Editor
 Amy McKenna – Line Producer
 Sam Register – Executive Producer
 Andrea Romano – Casting and Voice Director
 James Tucker – Producer

Home media
The series was not initially released on DVD in full season formats, like previous Batman series. A series of DVD volumes, with each containing 4–5 episodes, were first released. A two-disc collection of the first 13 episodes, season 1, part 1, was released on August 17, 2010. Season 1, part 2 was released on March 15, 2011, making the first season available both as separate volumes and two-part sets.

Season Two, Part One was released on August 16, 2011. It contained 12 episodes and did not contain "The Siege of Starro!". Warner Home Video confirmed that season 2, part 2 would be released on March 20, 2012. It contains 14 episodes, including the two-part "The Siege of Starro!" and the season 3 episode "Battle of the Superheroes!". The final release, season 3, complete, was June 19, 2012. The DVD also contains the unaired-on-TV season 2 episode "The Mask of Matches Malone!" as a bonus episode.

A Blu-ray set for the first season was released manufacture-on-demand on November 5, 2013 via Warner Archive. This was followed by a second-season manufacture-on-demand Blu-ray set on September 9, 2014, and a third-season manufacture-on-demand Blu-ray set on March 21, 2017. A first-season DVD box set was conventionally released on May 20, 2014, and a second-season DVD box set followed on April 7, 2015.

In other media

Comic book

In January 2009, the first issue of Batman: the Brave and the Bold was released. The comic book follows the same format as the show, starting off with a brief teaser segment at the start of the book which features Batman teaming up with an additional hero for a short adventure unrelated to the rest of the issue. Several authors have contributed to the comic book series, including Matt Wayne, J. Torres and Landry Walker.

Certain characters such as Superman, Wonder Woman, Captain Marvel Jr. and Mary Marvel made appearances in the comic prior to actually appearing in the show, while other characters, such as Power Girl, Kid Eternity, Brother Power and Angel and the Ape, appeared in the comic without ever actually appearing on the show. In addition, the depictions of several characters in the comic book (notably Katana and Talia al Ghul and The Doom Patrol and Damian Wayne) do not match up with their television counterparts, something that Brave and the Bold director Ben Jones stated stems from the comic artists not being given character reference sheets from the show's producers.

The Batman: The Brave and the Bold comic series began selling in the UK on March 11, 2010, published by Titan Magazines.

In late 2010, the series was relaunched as The All-New Batman: The Brave and the Bold, with the new creative team of Sholly Fisch and Rick Burchett. In order to devote more pages to the actual story, the teaser segments from the first series were dropped. This incarnation of the title lasted 16 issues. The final issue is a Valentine's-themed story featuring Batman, Batgirl and Bat-Mite.

Video games
 A video game inspired by the show was released on September 7, 2010, for the Wii and Nintendo DS by WayForward Technologies. The game is a 2D side-scroller for two players. Gentleman Ghost, Mongul, Catman, Gorilla Grodd and Catwoman are major villains in the game. It also features the Rogues, Two-Face, Clock King, Copperhead, Sinestro, Astaroth and Starro.
 On May 6, 2010, DCBeyond.com launched a Unity 3D Batman: The Brave and the Bold game for fans to play for free online.

Soundtracks

On 28 January 2014, La La Land Records released a 2-disc compilation of music from the series, featuring the musical scores for 12 episodes from the first and second seasons (including those of "Legends of the Dark Mite!", "The Mask of Matches Malone!" and "Chill of the Night!"). It is a limited edition release of 2000 units and can be purchased at the La La Land Records website.

A soundtrack exclusively covering songs from the musical episode "Mayhem of the Music Meister!" was released on October 24, 2009.

The main theme has also been included on The Music of DC Comics: 75th Anniversary Collection soundtrack.

See also

 Batman: The Animated Series
 The New Batman Adventures
 The Batman
 Beware the Batman
 Scooby-Doo! & Batman: The Brave and the Bold

References

External links

 DC page: TV series
 Batman: The Brave and the Bold Videogame
 Batman: The Brave and the Bold at World's Finest
 Batman: The Brave and the Bold at BatmanYTB.com
 Batman: The Brave and the Bold at BATMAN-ON-FILM.COM
 Batman: The Brave and the Bold at Animated Superheroes
 Batman: The Brave and the Bold at Legions of Gotham
 Batman: The Brave and the Bold at Big Cartoon DataBase
 
 "Batmanimation" The home for all things animated Batman
 Batman: The Brave and the Bold Toy List at the Parry Game Preserve.

 
2000s American animated television series
2010s American animated television series
2008 American television series debuts
2011 American television series endings
American children's animated action television series
American children's animated adventure television series
American children's animated comic science fiction television series
American children's animated science fantasy television series
American children's animated superhero television series
Anime-influenced Western animated television series
Animated Batman television series
Animated Justice League television series
English-language television shows
Animated television shows based on DC Comics
Television series by Warner Bros. Animation
Crossover animated television series
Television series created by Michael Jelenic
Television shows adapted into comics
Television shows adapted into video games
Cartoon Network original programming